Paul Feldman is the "Bagel Man" mentioned in Freakonomics by Levitt and Dubner, a man who started his own business selling bagels instead of pursuing his old occupation as director of non-defense research at the Center for Naval Analyses. He would leave bagels next to a box with a slit in the top in an office building, leaving a sign asking whoever took a bagel to give money in return.

His bagel selling statistics about how often people stole bagels have been used to determine white collar crime.

Feldman has an undergraduate degree in agriculture and a master's degree in agricultural economics from Cornell University. He went on to the PhD program in economics at MIT but never finished his thesis, leaving in 1962 to work at the Center For Naval Analyses in Arlington, Virginia. In later jobs, he worked on the Program Evaluation Staff of the US Bureau of the Budget (now the Office of Management and Budget), at the Institute for Defense Analysis, as a consultant on a National Security Council study of the military draft, and as deputy executive director on the staff of The President's Commission on Federal Statistics. His last employment before starting his bagel business was as director of The Public Research Institute of the Center For Naval Analyses, from 1971 to 1985, which focused on economic studies of government non-defense policies.

Publications
His publications include:

References

External links
 NY Times story

 

American businesspeople
Living people
Year of birth missing (living people)